Dušan Petronijević (Serbian Cyrillic: Душан Петронијевић; born 9 November 1983) is a Serbian professional footballer who plays as a midfielder.

Club career
Born in Kruševac, Petronijević started out at his hometown club Napredak. He made his senior debuts with Obilić in the 2002–03 season. Later on, Petronijević spent two seasons at BASK, before making a return to his parent club Napredak in the summer of 2007. He later moved to Iran and joined Damash Iranian.

In December 2011, Petronijević moved from Shakhter Karagandy to fellow Kazakhstan Premier League club Astana.

International career
Petronijević made his only appearance for Serbia on 3 June 2011, coming on as a substitute for Dejan Stanković in a 1–2 friendly loss to South Korea.

Statistics

Honours
Shakhter Karagandy
 Kazakhstan Premier League: 2011

References

External links

 
 
 
 

Association football midfielders
Damash Iranian players
Expatriate footballers in Iran
Expatriate footballers in Kazakhstan
FC Astana players
FC Shakhter Karagandy players
First League of Serbia and Montenegro players
FK BASK players
FK Borac Čačak players
FK BSK Borča players
FK Dinamo Vranje players
FK Jagodina players
FK Napredak Kruševac players
FK Obilić players
FK Radnički 1923 players
FK Sinđelić Beograd players
Kazakhstan Premier League players
Serbia international footballers
Serbian expatriate footballers
Serbian expatriate sportspeople in Iran
Serbian expatriate sportspeople in Kazakhstan
Serbian First League players
Serbian footballers
Serbian SuperLiga players
Sportspeople from Kruševac
1983 births
Living people